Harry Rhys Robinson (born 16 April 1993) is a former rugby union player who played on the wing for Cardiff Blues and the Scarlets and won 3 caps at international level for Wales.

Robinson started playing rugby at Pentyrch RFC, made his professional debut aged 17 for the Cardiff Blues in January 2011. He spent much of the next season playing for Wales in the Sevens World Series, but caught the eye in the shorter form of the game was called up to the senior XVs squad in January 2012 before Six Nations despite having made just 4 senior appearances for the Cardiff Blues. He then went on to make his debut that June against the Barbarians where he scored a try.

He became a regular starter for the Cardiff Blues over the 2012–13 season and won two further caps on the tour of Japan in June 2013. However the following season he only scored one try and dropped out of the international frame, and subsequently moved to the Scarlets.

In March 2015 he suffered a severe neck injury playing against Edinburgh that required surgery, despite making a brief comeback later in the year, the injury ultimately forced him to retire aged 23 on medical advice in April 2016.

References

External links
WRU profile
Cardiff Blues profile
Scarlets profile
ESPN Scrum profile
It's Rugby profile

1993 births
Living people
Cardiff RFC players
Cardiff Rugby players
People educated at Radyr Comprehensive School
Rugby union wings
Rugby union players from Cardiff
Wales international rugby union players